ATK may refer to:

Companies
Alliant Techsystems, an American aerospace, defense, and sporting goods company, now part of Northrop Grumman
ATK motorcycles, an off-road motorcycle manufacturer
A.T. Kearney, a management consulting firm
ATK Thiokol, or ATK Launch Systems Group, former names of Thiokol, an aerospace, defense and commercial products company, now part of Orbital ATK
ATK (football club), Indian football club active from 2014 to 2020

Software
Accessibility Toolkit, a GNOME API for developing accessible applications
Andrew Toolkit, part of the Andrew Project used to create and distribute documents
Atomistix ToolKit, software for atomic-scale modeling

Other uses
Arachidonyl trifluoromethyl ketone, an analog of arachidonic acid
Aboriginal traditional knowledge, cultural knowledge of aboriginal peoples
America's Test Kitchen, a cooking show on PBS
Arbetstidsförkortning, a system of additional leave entitlement in Sweden
Atqasuk Edward Burnell Sr. Memorial Airport, Atqasuk, Alaska (IATA Code: ATK)
Bruton's tyrosine kinase, a protein
Kiribati Grand Order (post-nominals: ATK)

See also
Attack (disambiguation)